Mount Sefton (Māori: Maukatua) is a mountain in the Aroarokaehe Range of the Southern Alps of New Zealand, just  south of Aoraki / Mount Cook.  To the south lies Mount Brunner, and to the north The Footstool, both more than  shorter.

The mountain is prominently visible from Mount Cook Village in the Hooker Valley, with Tuckett Glacier flowing down the south-eastern side of the mountain and Mueller Glacier in the valley below it.

The Douglas River (formerly known as the Twain River) begins on Mount Sefton.

An early resident, Charles French Pemberton, named the area, whilst the geologist Julius von Haast named the mountain after William Sefton Moorhouse, the second Superintendent of Canterbury Province. The Māori name of the mountain is Maukatua, which translates as 'mountain of the gods'.

Edward FitzGerald, with Matthias Zurbriggen as his guide, completed the first recorded climb to the summit shortly after Christmas 1894.

References

Sefton
Sefton
Aoraki / Mount Cook National Park
Sefton